HKST may refer to:
 Hong Kong Society of Transplantation, a Hong Kong organisation promoting transplantation and harvesting of organs and tissues
 Hong Kong Student Travel Ltd, a Hong Kong travel agency specialised in serving students
 Hong Kong Summer Time, a daylight saving measure in Hong Kong, eliminated in 1979